Tanggeon is a type of Korean traditional headgear worn by men, which is put under a gat (formal hat). It is usually made of dyed horsehair or cow hair. Artisans who specialize in making tanggeon are called tanggeonjang.

Gallery

See also
Jeongjagwan
Gat
Manggeon
Sangtu
Hanbok

References

External links

Korean headgear
Hats